First Methodist Church (First United Methodist Church) is a historic church building at 412 W. Main Street in Tupelo, Mississippi.

It was built in 1899 in a Gothic Revival style. The building was added to the National Register of Historic Places in 1990.

References

Methodist churches in Mississippi
Churches on the National Register of Historic Places in Mississippi
Gothic Revival church buildings in Mississippi
Churches completed in 1899
Buildings and structures in Tupelo, Mississippi
National Register of Historic Places in Lee County, Mississippi